Phyllodytes megatympanum is a frog in the family Hylidae endemic to Brazil.

The skin of the frog's dorsum is light brown with yellow coloration around the groin.  This frog has a large, visible tympanum.

References

 Amphibians described in 2017
Endemic fauna of Brazil
megatympanum